General elections were held in Saint Lucia on 14 April 1961. The result was a victory for the Saint Lucia Labour Party, which won nine of the ten seats.

Results

References

Saint Lucia
Elections in Saint Lucia
1961 in Saint Lucia
West Indies Federation
April 1961 events in North America
Election and referendum articles with incomplete results